Julio César Abbadie Gismero (7 September 1930 – 16 July 2014) was a Uruguayan footballer who played as a forward. During his career, he played for Peñarol, where he won the 1966 Copa Libertadores and the Intercontinental Cup.  He was born in Uruguay to French father and Spanish mother.

Club career
Born in Montevideo, Abbadie also played in Italy (from 1956 to 1962) with Genoa and Lecco. In total he played Serie A 140 matches and scored 31 goals. On 21 December 2004 he returned after 54 years to Genova, at Stadio Luigi Ferraris, during Serie B match against Empoli.

International career
For the Uruguay national team, Abbadie obtained 26 caps between 1952 and 1966, scoring 14 goals. He participated in the 1954 FIFA World Cup and scored two goals in a group match against Scotland.

Career statistics

International
Source:

References

External links

1930 births
2014 deaths
Footballers from Montevideo
Uruguayan people of French descent
Uruguayan people of Spanish descent
Association football forwards
Uruguayan footballers
Uruguay international footballers
1954 FIFA World Cup players
Peñarol players
Genoa C.F.C. players
Calcio Lecco 1912 players
Uruguayan Primera División players
Serie A players
Uruguayan expatriate footballers
Expatriate footballers in Italy
Uruguayan football managers
Danubio F.C. managers